Ardhin (also Romanized as Ardhīn and Ardahīn; also known as Ardehen and Ūrd-ī-Hūn) is a village in Zarrineh Rud Rural District, Bizineh Rud District, Khodabandeh County, Zanjan Province, Iran. At the 2006 census, its population was 809, in 151 families.

References 

Populated places in Khodabandeh County